Burdett O'Connor is a province in the northern part of Tarija Department in Bolivia.

The province is also known as Burdett O'Connor and is named after Francisco Burdett O'Connor, a chronicler of the South American War of Independence and the making of Tarija.

Location
Burdett O'Connor province is one of six provinces in the Tarija Department. It is located between 20° 53' and 21° 58' south and between 63° 36' and 64° 26' west.

The province borders Chuquisaca Department in the north, Eustaquio Méndez Province in the north-west, Cercado Province in the west, Aniceto Arce Province in the south-west, and Gran Chaco Province in the south and east. 

Population 
The main language of the province is Spanish, spoken by 98.4%, while 10.3% of the population speak Guaraní, also 1.8 speak Quechua, and 0.3% Aymara (by western immigrants). 

The population increased from 17,763 inhabitants (1992 census) to 19,339 (2001 census), an increase of 8.9%. - 47.5% of the population are younger than 15 years old. 

 89.5% of the population have no access to electricity, 84.5% have no sanitary facilities. 

 51.6% of the population are employed in agriculture, 14.6% in mining, 7.0% in industry, 26.8% in general services (2001).

 89.9% of the population are Catholics, 4.0% are Protestants (1992).

Division 
In contrast to the neighbouring provinces, the province comprises only one municipio which is Entre Ríos.
It is identical to the Burdett O'Connor Province.

Places of interest 
 Tariquía Flora and Fauna National Reserve

References

External links 
 Provincia Burnet O'Connor - general map from La Comisión para la Gestión Integral del Agua en Bolivia (CGIAB) 

Provinces of Tarija Department